is a passenger railway station located in Nakahara-ku, Kawasaki, Kanagawa Prefecture, Japan, operated by the East Japan Railway Company (JR East).

Lines
Musashi-Shinjō Station is served by the Nambu Line. The station is  the southern terminus of the line at Kawasaki Station.

Station layout
The station consists of a single elevated island platform serving two tracks with the station building underneath. The station is attended.

Platforms

History 
The stop was raised in status to that of a full station on 1 April 1944 with the nationalization of Nambu Railway, into the Japanese Government Railway (JGR) Nambu Line system. The JGR became the Japan National Railways (JNR) from 1946.
Along with privatization and division of JNR, JR East started operating the station on 1 April 1987. The tracks were elevated and the station rebuilt in 1990.

Passenger statistics
In fiscal 2019, the station was used by an average of 37,642 passengers daily (boarding passengers only).

The passenger figures (boarding passengers only) for previous years are as shown below.

Surrounding area
 Fujitsu Headquarters
Aimoru Shopping Street
Shinshiro Sun Mall Shopping Street (Nikko Shopping Street)
Shinjo Nishidori Shopping Street
Aiseikai Keihin General Hospital
Kanagawa Prefectural Shinjo High School

See also
 List of railway stations in Japan

References

External links

  

Railway stations in Kanagawa Prefecture
Railway stations in Japan opened in 1944
Railway stations in Kawasaki, Kanagawa